The invasion of Elba, codenamed Operation Brassard, was part of the Italian campaign during the Second World War. The invasion was carried out between 17–19 June 1944 by Free French Forces supported by British and American ships and aircraft.

According to the testimony of captured Germans, Allied activity had been observed on Corsica, thus the defenders were aware of the impending invasion 24 hours in advance. They resisted for two days before being given permission to withdraw to the mainland.

Background

This success was followed by orders for the invasion of southern France, Operation Dragoon. The 15th Army Group was asked to supply the majority of the troops for the landings. This reduced the U.S. 5th Army to five divisions. The whole of the 15th Army Group now only consisted of 18 divisions, and the reduction in strength put on hold any plans Alexander had of reaching the Gothic Line by August 1944.

One operation they could still carry out was the invasion of Elba, which had initially been scheduled for 25 May, at the same time as Operation Diadem. The landings had then been postponed because of the shortage of support aircraft and to allow the inexperienced French troops more time for training. The objectives of the invasion were to prevent the Germans using the island as a forward outpost and to provide a gun position for Allied artillery to interdict traffic through the Piombino channel.

It is not known if the Germans were aware of the Allied plans, but Adolf Hitler "attached great importance to holding Elba as long as possible." On 12 June, the German commander in Italy—Field Marshal Albert Kesselring—was informed that "Elba must be defended to the last man and the last cartridge." On 14 June, German reinforcements started to arrive on Elba from Pianosa. The decision to reinforce Elba was not known to the Allies who believed the naval activity between the island and the mainland was in fact an evacuation.

Planning
Rear-Admiral Thomas Hope Troubridge of the Royal Navy was in command of Force N, which would be responsible for landing the assault division. The division chosen for the assault was the French 9th Colonial Infantry Division, comprising the 4th and 13th Regiments Senegalese Tirailleurs, the Bataillion de Choc Commando, a Moroccan Goumier battalion and 200 mules.

Because of the shallow waters large naval and transport ships could not be used.

The naval force would be formed into three groups:
 Comprised Motor Torpedo Boats and PT boats. They would initially create diversions and land the French Commandos on the northern side of the island. Their objective would be the gun batteries located there.
 Comprised five Landing Craft Infantry (LCI) and eight Motor Launches each towing a Landing Craft Assault (LCA). Their objective was four beaches on the south coast.
 Comprised the main force, in nine LCIs, four Landing Ship Tanks (LSTs), and three Motor Launches towing Landing Craft Support (medium). The main landings would be on two beaches codenamed Kodak Amber and Kodak Green at 04:00. They would be followed at 04:30 by another 28 LCIs and after dawn by 40 LCTs, bringing in heavier equipment.

In the briefing immediately prior to the landing, Troubridge said he expected the shore batteries to have been taken out by aerial bombardment and the commandos. He also said the garrison only consisted of about 800 men, mostly of non-German nationalities who were unlikely to put up much resistance.

Invasion

On 16 June, the day before the invasion, German reconnaissance aircraft spotted two flotillas of invasion ships, but thought they were just the normal naval convoys between Naples and Bastia. To preserve the surprise, there was no pre-invasion bombing until the night of 16–17 June, when 26 Vickers Wellingtons bombed Portoferraio and Porto Longone.

The 270 ships of the invasion fleet arrived off Elba just after midnight on 17 June, when ships from Group 1 disembarked 87 men from the Bataillon de Choc Commando in rubber dinghys half a mile (800 m) offshore of Cape Enfola. The naval group then started laying a smokescreen to create a diversion.

At 03:15, three other boats started laying smoke north of Portoferraio. With the German gun batteries engaging a retreating PT boat, four others made toward Portoferraio to simulate landing craft approaching, firing salvos of rockets and dropping dummies overboard to give the impression of troops wading ashore.

In the south, the main invasion force was approaching the island when, at 03:38, a signal flare was fired and the Germans opened fire on the landing craft. The Royal Navy Commandos of Able 1 and Oboe 3 Commando with Able 2 in reserve landed at 03:50. They approached the beach toward their objective: the heavily armed German flak ship Köln, which was berthed at Marina di Campo and had a commanding view of both beaches.

This made its capture or destruction vital to the landings. The A1 Commando were assigned the task of capturing the ship, while O3 Commando would defend the jetty from any attack by German reinforcements. The two landing craft of the Royal Navy Commandos entered the bay of Marina di Campo and made for the flak ship. They came under heavy fire before one landing craft was hit and ran aground; the landing craft managed to get alongside the flak ship before also being hit by gunfire. The men of A commando quickly captured Köln while O Commando secured the jetty. Both commandos now waited for the French to secure the village.

The LCVPs carrying the French division beached right on time to be met by heavy machine gun and  fire. By 07:00, the German defences in the hills above Kodak Amber beach had forced the incoming landing craft to lay smoke and withdraw. The heavy defensive fire forced the follow-up waves of landing craft to divert to Kodak Green beach, which caused some congestion on the beachhead. Delays and German gunfire kept some landing craft off shore until 14:00.

The Royal Navy Commandos—unaware of the diversion to the other beach—had to wait some hours before the French cleared the village and reached them. It was during this time that the Royal Navy Commandos suffered their greatest losses.

The commandos were under continuous artillery and small arms fire, which is believed to have set off two demolition charges on the jetty, blowing a  hole in the concrete structure. The force of the explosions killed almost all the commandos and their prisoners. It also set fire to Köln and exploded the ammunition stowed on board.

Within two hours of the landings, French commandos had reached the crest of the  Monte Tambone Ridge overlooking the landing areas. Portoferraio was taken by the 9th Division on 18 June, and the island was largely secured by the following day. Fighting in the hills between the Germans and the Senegalese colonial infantry was vicious, with the Senegalese employing flamethrowers to clear entrenched German troops.

On 19 June, the German commander asked for permission to evacuate what was left of his forces. By the evening on 20 June, they had successfully evacuated 400 men to the mainland.

Aftermath
The invasion of Elba was of doubtful necessity. The advance of the U.S. 5th Army past Grosseto had made the continued occupation of the island by the Germans untenable.

The Germans defended Elba with two infantry battalions, fortified coastal areas, and several coastal artillery batteries totalling some 60 guns of medium and heavy calibre. In the fighting for the island, the Germans lost 500 dead, with another 1,995 becoming prisoners of war.

French losses were 252 killed or missing, and 635 men wounded, while the British lost 38 killed and nine wounded. General de Tassigny went on to command the French 1st Army in the invasion of southern France. This force fought through Europe to the Austrian border by the end of the war.

There were attacks on civilians by French colonial forces after the invasion. According to Carabinieri reports, there were 191 rapes, 21 attempts including one on a boy, 11 murders and widespread looting; these events are known in Italy as "Marocchinate".

Notes

References
 
 
 
 
 
 

Battles and operations of World War II involving France
Aerial operations and battles of World War II involving the United Kingdom
Naval battles of World War II involving the United Kingdom
Invasion
Military operations of World War II involving Germany
World War II British Commando raids
World War II operations and battles of the Italian Campaign
Invasions of Italy
Invasions by the United States
Invasions by the United Kingdom
Elba
Amphibious operations of World War II
Amphibious operations involving the United Kingdom